David Targamadze (born 22 August 1989) is a Georgian professional footballer who plays as a winger for FC Samtredia. He represented the Georgia national team between 2011 and 2014.

Career
Born in Tbilisi, Targamadze played youth football in Georgia with FC Dinamo Tbilisi before moving to German side SC Freiburg in 2006. Targamadze made his senior debut for Freiburg on 28 September 2008, in a match against Alemannia Aachen. He made a total of six league appearances for Freiburg that season, helping them win promotion to the Bundesliga. Targamadze made a further two first team appearances for Freiburg the following season, before signing for Ukrainian club PFC Oleksandria in the summer of 2010. He played 18 league games and scored eight goals during 2010–11, helping Oleksandria win the Ukrainian First League and gain promotion to the top division.

On 30 December 2011, Shakhtar Donetsk officially announced Targamadze's capture on its official website. He signed on loan for PFC Oleksandria in August 2015.

In July 2018, after missing two years due to knee injuries, he returned to Georgia and signed for FC Saburtalo Tbilisi. He left the club at the end of 2018.

Personal life
David is the brother of Irakli Targamadze, a fellow professional footballer.

Career statistics

Scores and results list Georgia's goal tally first, score column indicates score after each Targamadze goal.

Honours
SC Freiburg:
 2. Bundesliga: 2008–09

PFC Oleksandria:
 Ukrainian First League: 2010–11

References

1989 births
Living people
Footballers from Georgia (country)
Association football wingers
Georgia (country) international footballers
Georgia (country) under-21 international footballers
SC Freiburg players
FC Oleksandriya players
FC Shakhtar Donetsk players
FC Mariupol players
FC Saburtalo Tbilisi players
FC Sioni Bolnisi players
FC Shevardeni-1906 Tbilisi players
FC Samtredia players
Ukrainian Premier League players
Bundesliga players
2. Bundesliga players
Erovnuli Liga players
Expatriate footballers from Georgia (country)
Expatriate sportspeople from Georgia (country) in Ukraine
Expatriate footballers in Ukraine
Expatriate sportspeople from Georgia (country) in Germany
Expatriate footballers in Germany